Wat Nimmanoradi (also written as Nimma Noradi, Nimmanoradee) is a Thai Buddhist temple in Bangkok. It is a third grade royal monastery by the canal Khlong Phasi Charoen in the border of Phasi Charoen area, just across the canal is Bang Khae area. Therefore, this temple is often mistaken for its location in district of Bang Khae.

Its former name was Wat Bang Khae and it believed to be built during the early of Rattanakosin period around 1807. In the reign of King Rama I, Wat Bang Khae was very prosperous but later it deteriorated. In 1872 during the reign of King Rama V, the abbot Chaeng a Buddhist monk had transferred from Wat Rakhang and ruled the temple, and Khun Tan Wanochakorn (Nim) with his wife named Di who were wealthy people became the patrons and renovated the temple completely. 

After  the renovation the temple was renamed to Wat Nimmanoradi like today (Nimmanoradi is the name of the fifth of six heavenly realm, according to the belief in Buddhist cosmology) and received Wisungkhammasima (boundary in the temple which was given by the King) on May 13, 1879. Later, when the construction of the new ordinationa hall was completed, it received a new Wisungkhammasima on November 8, 1971.
 
There is the Thai monogram of King Rama IX, "Phor Por Ror" (ภ.ป.ร.) on the gable of the new ordination hall. The dwelling for monks and Thai-style sermon hall were all built from teak wood. There is also a stūpa where the holy relic of Lord Buddha was put inside. This stūpa was built in 1974, Princess Maha Chakri Sirindhorn came to solemnize raising Chatra (tiered umbrella) ceremony on December 7, 1980. Inside the ordination hall, there is a principal Buddha image in Māravijaya posture, made of mixed brass and gilded lacquering named Luang Pho Ket Champa Si (หลวงพ่อเกศจำปาศรี). In addition, there are also various idols of Chinese god such as Guanyin, Kātyāyana to be worshiped as well.

Wat Nimmanoradi is located on the bank of Khlong Phasi Charoen, in the area where it joins Khlong Ratchamontri and adjacent to Bang Khae Market, which has been a marketplace and waterfront community since the past. Now it has been renovated as Wat Nimmanoradee Floating Market and is one of the attractions of Phasi Charoen district apart from fame Wat Paknam Bhasicharoen.

References

External links
Floating Temple Nimmanoradee.
Phasi Charoen district
Buddhist temples in Bangkok
Unregistered ancient monuments in Bangkok
19th-century Buddhist temples